A list of ragtime composers, including a famous or characteristic composition.

Pre-1940
Felix Arndt (1889–1918), "Nola" (1916)
May Aufderheide (1888–1972), "Dusty Rag" (1908)
Roy Bargy (1894–1974), "Pianoflage" (1922)
Harry Belding (1882–1931), "Good Gravy Rag" (1913)
Theron C. Bennett (1879–1937), "The St. Louis Tickle" (1904)
Irving Berlin (1888–1989), "Alexander's Ragtime Band" (1911)
Charlotte Blake (1885–1979), "That Poker Rag" (1909)
Eubie Blake (1887–1983), "Charleston Rag" (1917)
Rube Bloom (1902–1976), "Soliloquy" (1926)
Blind Boone (1864–1927), "Southern Rag Medley No. 2" (1909)
George Botsford (1874–1949), "Black and White Rag"
Euday L. Bowman (1887–1949), "Twelfth Street Rag" (1914)
Fleta Jan Brown, (1882–1938), "Tanglefoot Rag" (1907)
Brun Campbell (1884–1952), "Barber Shop Rag"
Hughie Cannon (1877–1912), "(Won't You Come Home) Bill Bailey" (1902)
Louis Chauvin (1881–1908), "Heliotrope Bouquet" (1907)
Axel Christensen (1881–1955), "The Ragtime Wedding March (Apologies to Mendelssohn)" (1902)
George L. Cobb (1886–1942), "Russian Rag"
Nellie Weldon Cocroft (1885–1986), "The Pinywoods Rag" (1909)
Zez Confrey (1895–1971), "Kitten on the Keys" (1921)
Les C. Copeland (1887–1942), "French Pastry Rag" (1914)
Irene Cozad (1888–1970), "Affinity Rag" (1910)
Cecil Duane Crabb (1890–1953), "Fluffy Ruffles" (1907)
Ford Dabney (1883–1958)
Reverend Gary Davis (1896–1972), "Italian Rag"
Claude Debussy (1862–1918), "Golliwogg's Cakewalk" and "Général Lavine"
James Reese Europe (1880–1919), "Castle House Rag"
Libbie Erickson (1875–1938), "Topsy: Two Step" (1904)
Ernst Fischer (1900–1975), "Pretty Baby" 
George Gershwin (1898–1937), "Rialto Ripples" (1917)
Irene Giblin (1888–1974), "Columbia Rag" (1910)
Lucian Porter Gibson (1890–1959), "Jinx Rag" (1911)
George Hamilton Green (1893–1970), "Ragtime Robin"
Gene Greene (1877–1930), "King of the Bungaloos" (1911)
Harry P. Guy (1870–1950), "Echoes from the Snowball Club" (1898)
Robert Hampton (1890–1945), "Agitation Rag" (1915)
Ben Harney (1871–1938), "You've Been a Good Old Wagon but You Done Broke Down" (1896)
Scott Hayden (1882–1915), "Something Doing" (1903)
Wallie Herzer (1885–1961), "Everybody Two-Step"
Ernest Hogan (1865–1909), "La Pas Ma La" and "All Coons Look Alike to Me" 
Abe Holzmann (1874–1939), "Smoky Mokes" (1899)
Charles Hunter (1876–1906), "Tickled to Death" (1899)
Harry Jentes (1887–1958), "Bantam Step" (1916)
Charles L. Johnson (1876–1950), "Dill Pickles" (1906)
James P. Johnson (1891–1955), "Carolina Shout" (1925)
Scott Joplin (1868–1917), "Maple Leaf Rag" (1899) and "The Entertainer" (1902)
Joe Jordan (1882–1971), "That Teasin' Rag" (1909)
Verdi Karns (1882–1925), "Kentucky Rag" (1898)
Sadie Koninsky (1879–1952), "Eli Green's Cake Walk" (1898)
Max Kortlander (1890–1961), "Deuces Wild" (1923)
William Krell (1868–1933), "Mississippi Rag" (1897)
Joseph Lamb (1887–1960), "Top Liner Rag" (1916) and "American Beauty Rag" (1913)
Grace LeBoy (1890–1983) "Everybody Rag With Me" 1914
Henry Lodge (1884–1933), "Temptation Rag" (1909)
George Lyons (1889–1958), Spaghetti Rag (1910)
Arthur Marshall (1881–1968), "Ham And!" (1908)
Artie Matthews (1888–1958), "Pastime Rag No. 3" (1916)
Billy Mayerl (1902–1959), "The Jazz Master" (1925)
Blind Willie McTell (1898–1959) "Southern Can Is Mine"
Kerry Mills (1869–1948), "At a Georgia Campmeeting" (1897)
Luella Lockwood Moore (aka "Marion Arlington") (1864–1927), "Flamingo: Two-Step" (1910)
Jelly Roll Morton (1890–1941), "Frog-I-More Rag" (1918)
Julia Lee Niebergall (1886–1968), "Hoosier Rag" (1907)
Theodore Havermeyer Northrup (1866–1919), "Louisiana Rag" (1897) 
Phil Ohman (1896–1954), "Dixie Kisses"
Muriel Pollock (1895–1970), "Rooster Rag" (1917)
Paul Charles Pratt (1890–1948), "Colonial Glide" (1910)
Arthur Pryor (1870–1942), "Razzazza Mazzazza" (1905)
Luckey Roberts (1887–1968), "Junk Man Rag" (1913)
Bess E. Rudisill (1884–1957), "The Eight O'Clock Rush" (1911)
J. Russel Robinson (1892–1963), "Sapho Rag" (1909)
Alma Sanders (1882–1956), "Sleepytime Rag: Pickaninny Lullaby" (1914)
Paul Sarebresole (1875–1911), "Roustabout Rag" (1897)
Arthur Schutt (1902–1965), "Bluin' the Black Keys" (1926)
James Scott (1885–1938), "Frog Legs Rag" (1906) and "Grace and Beauty" (1909)
Adaline Shepherd (1883–1950), "Pickles and Peppers" (1906)
Willie "The Lion" Smith (1897–1973), "Rippling Waters"
Ted Snyder (1881–1965), "Ramshackle Rag" (1911)
John Philip Sousa (1854–1932), "With Pleasure" (1912) and "Willow Blossoms" (1916)
Etilmon J. Stark (1867–1962), "Billiken Rag" (1913)
Nellie Stokes (1880–1914), "Razzle Dazzle: Rag" (1909)
Pauline B. Story (1870-1952)  “Keep A Shufflin’ Ragtime Dance” (1905)
Charley Straight (1891–1940), "Rufenreddy" (1921)
Igor Stravinsky (1882–1971), "Piano-Rag-Music" (1919)
Robert Morrison Stults (1861–1933), "Walkin' on de Rainbow Road" (1899)
Wilbur Sweatman (1882–1961), "Down Home Rag" (1911)
Charles Hubbard Thompson (1891–1964), "The Lily Rag" (1914)
Harry Tierney (1890–1965), "Uncle Tom's Cabin" (1911)
Tom Turpin (1873–1922), "Harlem Rag" (1897)
Fats Waller (1904–1943), "Valentine Stomp" (1929)
Percy Wenrich (1880–1952), "Peaches and Cream" (1905)
Clarence C. Wiley (1883–1908), "Car-Barlick Acid" (1901)
Carlotta Williamson (1869–1957), "The Pickaninny Cakewalk:  Two Step" (1901), "Wild flower Rag" (1910)
Clarence Woods (1888–1956), "Slippery Elm Rag" (1912)
Calvin Woolsey (1884–1946), "Medic Rag" (1910)
Bob Yosco (1889–1958), Spaghetti Rag (1910)

Modern ragtime composers (since 1940)

William Albright (1944–1998), "Brass Knuckles"
Luca Allegranza (born 2003), "Pipe Dreams Rag"
Peter Andersson (born 1968), "The River Boat Slow Drag"
James F. Andris (born 1938), "The St. Louis Zoo Rag"
 Donald Ashwander (composer) (1929-1994), "Business in Town," "Old Streets," etc.
 Winifred Atwell (1914-1989), "Britannia Rag", "Let's Have a Party", her version of "Black and White Rag", etc.
Rami Bar-Niv "Blue-Rag" "Drag-Rag" "Breezy Rider Rag" "Plain Ol' Rag" "Shmateh-Rag"
William Bolcom (born 1938), "The Graceful Ghost"
Sune "Sumpen" Borg (1931–2002), "Ylva Rag"
Dave Brubeck (1920–2012) "It's a Raggy Waltz" (1961)
Lou Busch (1910–1979) "Carr's Hop" (1952)
Bill Edwards (born 1959), "Hanon Rag", "Blood on the Keys", etc.
Keith Emerson (1944–2016), "Barrelhouse Shakedown"
Stephen Flaherty (born 1960), Ragtime
Frank French (born 1952), "Belle of Louisville"
Ragnar Hellspong (born 1944), "Rag's Rag"
Dick Hyman (born 1927), "Ragtime Razz Matazz" (1958)
Hal Isbitz (born 1931), "Chandelier Rag"
Glenn Jenks, "The Harbour Rag"
Billy Joel (born 1949), "Root Beer Rag" (1974)
Elena Kats-Chernin (born 1957), "Russian Rag"
Sue Keller (born 1952), "Cranberry Stomp"
James LeGrand King III (born 1968), "Biltmore Syncopations," "Whitehead Street Rag," "Zig-Zag Alley Rag," "Professor King's Celebrated All-Purpose Exceptional Invigorating Effectactious Good-Time Spirited Composition for the Modern Piano-Forte," "Major-Minor Rag" 
Bill Krenz (1899–1980), "Mud Cat Rag" (1953)
Florian Krueger (born 1993), "Hok Him Rag", "Futuristic Kitten", "Inshoku-ten"
Tom Lehrer (born 1928), "The Vatican Rag"
Peter Lundberg (born 1942), "Gothenburg Rag"
Johnny Maddox, "Friday Night Stomp"
Paul McCartney (born 1942) "Martha My Dear", "Honey Pie" (1968), "You Gave Me the Answer" (1975)
Oleg Mezjuev (born 1966), "Café Parisién"
Max Morath (born 1926), "One for Amelia," "The Golden Hours," etc.
Gary Noland (born 1957), "Grand Rag Brillante", "Nerdfox Rag", "Ragbones", "Russell Street Rag" 
Carter Pann (born 1972), "The Bills"
David Thomas Roberts (born 1955), "Roberto Clemente"
Aaron Robinson (born 1970) "Bluet Rag"
Reginald Robinson (born 1972), "The Strong Man"
Thomas Shea (1931–1982), "Little Wabash Special"
Joakim Stenshäll (1962–2009), "Entropy Rag"
Trebor Jay Tichenor (1940–2014), "Bucksnort Stomp"
Hiromi Uehara (born 1979), "The Tom and Jerry Show" (2003)
Nobuo Uematsu (born 1959), "Spinach Rag" (1994)
Kjell Waltman (born 1960), "Orange Blossoms"
Chris Ware (born 1967), "Farewell"
Ian Whitcomb (1941–2020), "Lawns of Louisiana", "Marzipan" and others
Dick Zimmerman (born 1937), "Lost And Found Rag"
Max Keenlyside, "Northern Lights Rag", "Amherst Rag", "Too Many Spoons"

Notes

References

Ragtime